The masked antpitta (Hylopezus auricularis) is a species of bird in the family Grallariidae. It is endemic to Bolivia in the city of Riberalta and around. It is in particular located in Puerto Hamburgo and in the Aquicuana Reserve.

Its natural habitat is subtropical or tropical moist lowland forest.

References

External links
BirdLife Species Factsheet.

masked antpitta
Birds of the Bolivian Amazon
Endemic birds of Bolivia
masked antpitta
Taxonomy articles created by Polbot